Steven "Steve" Smith (born 16 May 1979 from Maidstone, Kent) is a former English professional darts player, who played in Professional Darts Corporation events. He has the nickname Smudger.

Darts career
Smith played in the 2004 PDC World Darts Championship, beating Norman Madhoo of Guyana in the last 48 to reach the last 40 stage, where he lost 3-0 to Mark Dudbridge of England.

Smith’s best performance in a PDC major was arguably his last 16 performance in the 2006 Desert Classic, where he lost 3-0 in sets to Raymond Van Barneveld.

Smith played in his second world championship in the 2007 PDC World Darts Championship, where he lost 3-0 to Denis Ovens of England in the last 64 stage.

Playing Style
Smith is a consistent scorer and finisher, who is aggressive on high checkouts . His stance incorporates a prominent lean and he throws at a steady pace.

World Championship performances

PDC
 2004: Last 40: (lost to Mark Dudbridge 0–3)
 2007: Last 64: (lost to Denis Ovens 0-3)

References

External links

1979 births
Living people
English darts players
Professional Darts Corporation associate players
Sportspeople from Maidstone